The RT-2 was an intercontinental ballistic missile deployed by the Soviet Union, which was in service from December 1968 until 1976. It was assigned the NATO reporting name SS-13 Savage and carried the GRAU index 8K98. Designed by OKB-1, about 60 were built by 1972.

History
The RT-2 was the first solid-propellant ICBM in Soviet service, and was a development of the earlier RT-1 series. It was a three-stage inertially-guided missile comparable to the American Minuteman missile. It was armed with a single 600 kiloton warhead and was silo-launched, although a rail-based version was contemplated by Soviet planners. It was deployed in the Yoshkar-Ola missile field.

The Soviets used the two upper stages of the RT-2 to develop the RT-15 mobile IRBM system. The RT-2PM Topol is supposedly a modernized version of the RT-2

Operations
The RT-2 was capable of delivering a  class payload to a maximum operational range of approximately 10,000 km (5,500 nautical miles)

Command and Control
A single launch control center (LCC) monitored numbers of launchers. The hardened and dispersed silo concept increased system survivability and provided steady environmental controls from the solid-propellant motors. Headquarters RVSN exercised normal control of the RT-2 missile force, through an intermediate RVSN Army and launch complex headquarters (HCC). A launch complex consisted of an HCC and several LCCs, monitoring numerous underground launchers.

Flight test history

Test Launches

General Characteristics

 Length: 20,000 mm (65.6 ft)
 Diameter: 1,700 mm (5.57 ft)
 Launch Weight: 34,000 kg (33.46 tons)
 Guidance: inertial guidance
 Propulsion: solid, three-stage
 Warhead: 600kt nuclear
 Range:

Operators 
   The Strategic Rocket Forces were the only operator of the RT-2.

Photo gallery

See also 
 RT-2PM Topol
 List of missiles
 List of rockets

References

 Hogg, Ian (2000). Twentieth-Century Artillery. Friedman/Fairfax Publishers. 
 S.P.Korolev RSC Energia Rocket RT-2P

External links

Cold War intercontinental ballistic missiles of the Soviet Union
RT-002
Arsenal Plant (Saint Petersburg) products
Military equipment introduced in the 1960s